Robert Frater can refer to:

 Robert Frater (cricketer) (1902–1968), New Zealand cricketer
 Robert Frater (fencer) (born 1887), British Olympic fencer